Elena Dementieva and Janette Husárová were the defending champions, but had different outcomes. Dementieva had to withdraw due to a left foot strain, while Husárová teamed up with Elena Likhovtseva and reached the semifinals.

Virginia Ruano Pascual and Paola Suárez won the title, defeating Kim Clijsters and Ai Sugiyama 6–3, 4–6, 6–4 in the final. It was the 20th title for Ruano Pascual and the 27th title for Suárez in their respective doubles careers. It was also the 2nd title for the pair during this season, after their win in Charleston.

Seeds
The first four seeds received a bye into the second round.

Draw

Finals

Top half

Bottom half

External links
 Main and Qualifying Draws

MasterCard German Open - Doubles
WTA German Open